Heaven at Home (Spanish:El cielo dentro de la casa or Navidades en junio) is a 1960 Spanish comedy film directed by Tulio Demicheli and starring Alberto Closas, Marga López and Rafael Alonso.

The film's sets were designed by the art director Enrique Alarcón.

Cast
 Alberto Closas as Dr. Julio Medina  
 Marga López as Laura Medina  
 Rafael Alonso as Daniel  
 José Luis López Vázquez as Oltrán  
 María del Puy as Susana  
 Tony Soler as Mercedes  
 Gracita Morales as Paciente  
 Juan Cortés as Solitario seductor  
 José Morales as Camarero  
 Mercedes Barranco as Vendedora de lotería  
 Gregorio Alonso 
 Rafael Corés
 Pepita C. Velázquez
 Nélida Romero 
 Dolores Villadres
 Consuelo Durán 
 Montserrat Blanch
 Maite Blasco as Luisa
 María Victoria Ayllón
 Ana María Puerto

References

Bibliography
 John King & Nissa Torrents. The Garden of Forking Paths: Argentine Cinema. British Film Institute, 1988.

External links 

1960 films
Spanish comedy films
1960 comedy films
1960s Spanish-language films
Films directed by Tulio Demicheli
1960s Spanish films